Argyle is a city in Denton County, Texas, United States, with a population of 4,403 as of 2020. It is a suburb of Fort Worth.

History

The first European settlement, consisting of a few families, occurred in the Argyle area in the 1850s. The place was then known as Pilot Knob or Waintown. The settlement gradually acquired a few amenities in the late 1800s: a school in 1875, a Baptist church in 1876, and a post office in 1878. The community was formally founded and renamed Argyle in 1881, after the Texas and Pacific railroad built a track through the area. Some believe a railroad surveyor named the town after a garden in France. However, others believe the town to be named after the region of Argyll in Scotland. Also around this time was when Sam Bass, an infamous outlaw who stole $60,000 in gold coins from the Union Pacific Railroad, was rumored to have stashed the gold in a cave. Sam Bass died when he was 27, and it was rumored he never lived to retrieve the gold.

Growth was very slow during the nineteenth century, and by 1890 Argyle only had a population of 148. The town did boast several agriculture-related industries, such as grist mills, general stores, and a cotton gin. In 1885 Argyle built a two-story brick school, and population grew until it reached 238 in 1930. A bank was also established in 1906, a little red brick building with a drugstore in the front. The bank wasn't around long before it was robbed in 1912. The robbers made away with $1700 and were never caught. Electricity and telephone service became available in the mid-1930s.

The Great Depression took its toll on the Argyle area, and the population declined to only ninety in 1950. Argyle incorporated as a separate city on September 19, 1960, with M.H. Wilson as the first mayor. Gradually the town grew in population as more people from the Dallas–Fort Worth area discovered its rural charm. By the 1970s a number of retail establishments were located in Argyle, and the population reached 1,575 in 1990, and doubled from that figure to 3,282 at the 2010 census. The high rate of growth is expected to continue as part of the general development of northern areas in the Dallas–Fort Worth metroplex.

Geography

Argyle is located at  (33.116422, –97.185461).

Demographics

As of the 2020 United States census, there were 4,403 people, 1,582 households, and 1,301 families residing in the city.

Education and local notes

The Argyle Independent School District serves the town of Argyle and neighboring areas. The district contains five schools: Hilltop Elementary (grades PreK–3), Argyle West Elementary (grades PreK–5), intermediate (grades 4 and 5), middle (grades 6–8), and a high school (grades 9–12). Argyle High School is in classification 4A D1 for UIL.  In addition, Liberty Christian School is also located in Argyle, offering grades PK3–12.

Argyle has established a police department and a municipal court, and has a low crime rate. The town sponsored an annual bluegrass music festival, but this ended in 2012.

Notable people

 JoJo Fletcher, Reality Star of the Bachelorette/Bachelor
 Walt Garrison, former professional football player for the Dallas Cowboys

References

External links
 Town of Argyle official website
 

Dallas–Fort Worth metroplex
Cities in Texas
Cities in Denton County, Texas
Populated places established in 1881
1881 establishments in Texas